Lithuanian National Drama Theatre, located on Gediminas Avenue in Vilnius, is one of Lithuania’s most prominent publicly funded performing arts venues and cultural institutions. Founded as a Vilnius State Theatre in 1940, it became Lithuanian National Drama Theatre in 1998. The theatre’s façade featuring the Feast of Muses sculpture has become a landmark of Vilnius city.

Notable productions

2010–2016 

Visuomenės priešas (Public Enemy) by Henrik Ibsen directed by Jonas Vaitkus (2011)
Chaosas (Chaos) by Mika Myllyaho directed by Yana Ross (2011)
Išvarymas (Expulsion) by Marius Ivaškevičius, directed by Oskaras Koršunovas (2011)
Katedra (Cathedral) by Justinas Marcinkevičius directed by Oskaras Koršunovas (2012)
Mūsų klasė (Our Class) by Tadeusz Słobodzianek directed by Yana Ross (2013)
Kosmosas+ (Cosmos+) directed by Kirsten Dehlholm (2014)
Jelizaveta Bam (Elizabeth Bam) by Daniil Charms directed by Oskaras Koršunovas (2015)
Kankinys (Martyr) by Marius von Mayenburg directed by Oskaras Koršunovas (2015)
Didvyrių aikštė (Heroes‘ Square) by Thomas Bernhard directed by Krystian Lupa (2015)
Borisas Godunovas (Boris Godunov) by Alexander Pushkin directed by Eimuntas Nekrošius (2015)
Oidipo mitas (The Oedipus Myth) by Sophocles, Euripides, Aeschylus directed by Gintaras Varnas (2016)

References

External links

1940 establishments in Lithuania
Performing groups established in 1940
Theatres in Vilnius